No Future is an original novel written by Paul Cornell and based on the long-running British science fiction television series Doctor Who. It features the Seventh Doctor, Ace and Bernice. A prelude to the novel, also penned by Cornell, appeared in Doctor Who Magazine #209. This novel is the conclusion to the "Alternate Universe cycle".

The title is a reference to the Sex Pistols song "God Save The Queen".

Plot

London, while Bernice becomes lead singer in a punk band, the Doctor must face more than one old enemy.

References

External links

1994 British novels
1994 science fiction novels
Virgin New Adventures
Novels by Paul Cornell
Seventh Doctor novels
Fiction set in 1976
Alien invasions in fiction